This list of museums in Washington state encompasses museums defined for this context as institutions (including nonprofit organizations, government entities, and private businesses) that collect and care for objects of cultural, artistic, scientific, or historical interest and make their collections or related exhibits available for public viewing. Also included are non-profit and university art galleries.  Museums that exist only in cyberspace (i.e., virtual museums) are not included. Defunct museums are listed in a separate section.

List of museums

Defunct museums
 Camp 6 Logging Museum, Tacoma, closed in 2011
 Castle Rock Exhibit Hall, Castle Rock, closed in 2014
 Children's Activity Museum, Ellensburg, closed in 2014
 Columbia River Exhibition of History, Science, and Technology, Richland, closed in 2014
 Consolidated Works - Seattle
 Fairchild Heritage Museum & Air Park, closed in 2002
 Rosalie Whyel Museum of Doll Art, Bellevue, closed in 2012
 Three Rivers Children's Museum, Richland
 Washington State Railroads Historical Society Museum, Pasco
 Western Bridge, Seattle

See also

 List of museums in Seattle, Washington
 Aquaria in Washington (category)
 Nature Centers in Washington

References

External links
Experience Washington - Museums & Galleries
Washington Museum directory from Sherman Museum

Washington

Tourist attractions in Washington (state)
Museums
Washington (state) education-related lists